Rashod Alexander Swinger (born November 27, 1974) is a former professional American football defensive lineman who played three seasons for the Arizona Cardinals.

Swinger attended Manalapan High School in Englishtown, New Jersey and played football for Rutgers University.

References

1974 births
Living people
Manalapan High School alumni
Sportspeople from Monmouth County, New Jersey
Players of American football from Paterson, New Jersey
American football defensive tackles
American football defensive ends
Rutgers Scarlet Knights football players
Arizona Cardinals players